Hackney Central is a London Overground station on the North London line in Hackney Central, Greater London. The station and all trains serving it are operated by National Rail services under the control of the London Rail division of Transport for London. However, there is no standard red National Rail "double arrow" logo signage at the station, instead only the Overground roundel.

This walkway means passengers do not have to exit on to the street in order to continue their onward journey.

History

Early years

The North London Railway opened a station named Hackney on 26 September 1850, to the east of Mare Street, then in the county of Middlesex. It closed on 1 December 1870 and was replaced the same day by a station to the west of Mare Street, designed by Edwin Henry Horne and also named Hackney. This station passed in due course to the London and North Western Railway and later on to the London, Midland and Scottish Railway, which closed the entire North London line east of Dalston Junction to passenger traffic in 1944.

Just to the west of the station a goods yard called Graham Road was opened by the Great Eastern Railway in 1894. Located just west of the GER Hackney Downs railway viaduct the depot consisted of seven sidings dealing with coal and general goods. The land had originally been purchased for a rail link between the North London and Great Eastern Railways.

Graham Road goods yard closed in October 1965. The site was finally used to link the North London and Great Eastern lines when in anticipation of the closure of Broad Street railway station in 1985 the "Graham Road Curve" was opened to traffic.

Reopening
On 12 May 1980, the station was reopened by British Rail as part of the Crosstown Linkline service, this time named Hackney Central, a little to the west of the 1870 station. The 1870 station building designed by Edwin Henry Horne is no longer in use by the railway, but is one of only two examples of North London Railway architecture still in situ, the other being Camden Road station, which is still open. Access to the modern Hackney Central station is from an alleyway adjacent to the 1870 building on Mare Street, as well as a more direct access from Amhurst Road. 

The former station building is now a bar and music venue.

Line improvement
The line reopened on 1 June 2010, initially with a reduced service and none on Sundays. The full seven-day service resumed on 22 May 2011, with extra services running all day in place of the additional shuttle trains which had previously run between Camden Road and Stratford stations in the morning and evening peaks.

Opening of second entrance
A new entrance from the south in Graham Road with ticket office and footbridge was opened in 2022.

Services

The typical off-peak service in trains per hour (tph) is:
4 tph westbound to  via ,  and 
4 tph westbound to Clapham Junction
8 tph eastbound to

Future proposals

Crossrail 2
Hackney Central is a proposed stop on Crossrail 2. It would be between Angel and Tottenham Hale or Seven Sisters. The platforms would be underground, with a connection to the existing surface station.

Docklands Light Railway
In February 2006 the Docklands Light Railway (DLR) Horizon 2020 report, had suggested that the DLR be extended here from Bow Church via Old Ford and Homerton, taking over the old parts of the North London line to link up Poplar and Canary Wharf. However, most of the former North London line between Hackney Wick and Bow Church has been built on. .

Connections
London Bus routes 30, 38, 55, 106, 236, 242, 253, 254, 276, 277, 394 and W15 and night routes N38, N55 and N253 serve the station.

References

External links

Excel file displaying National Rail station usage information for 2005/06 

Proposed Chelsea-Hackney Line stations
Railway stations in the London Borough of Hackney
Former North London Railway stations
Railway stations in Great Britain opened in 1850
Railway stations in Great Britain closed in 1870
Railway stations in Great Britain opened in 1870
Railway stations in Great Britain closed in 1944
Railway stations in Great Britain opened in 1980
Railway stations served by London Overground
Hackney, London
Hackney Central